6-Methoxy-(8-p-toluenesulfonamido)quinoline (TSQ) is one of the most efficient fluorescent stains for zinc(II). It was introduced by Soviet biochemists Toroptsev and Eshchenko in the early 1970s. The popularity of TSQ as physiological stain rose after seminal works by Christopher Frederickson two decades later. TSQ forms a 2:1 (ligand-metal) complex with zinc and emits blue light upon excitation at 365 nanometers. TSQ has been extensively applied for determination of extracellular or intracellular levels of Zn2+ in biological systems, also to study Zn2+ in mossy fibers of the hippocampus.

References 

Fluorescent dyes
Quinolinols
Sulfonamides
Aromatic amines